Edward Sauer (January 3, 1919 – July 1, 1988) was an American professional baseball player. An outfielder, he appeared in 189 Major League games in 1943–1945 and in 1949 for the Chicago Cubs,  St. Louis Cardinals and Boston Braves.

The younger brother of slugger Hank Sauer, Ed was born in Pittsburgh, Pennsylvania, and attended Elon College. His pro career extended for a dozen years, 1940 through 1951. He was a member of the pennant-winning 1945 Cubs and appeared as a pinch hitter twice (in games 5 and 7) during the 1945 World Series, striking out each time against Baseball Hall of Fame left-handed pitcher Hal Newhouser.

During his Major League career, Sauer collected 117 hits, including 25 doubles, two triples and five home runs.

References

External links

1919 births
1988 deaths
Akron Yankees players
Baseball players from Pittsburgh
Boston Braves players
Chicago Cubs players
Easton Yankees players
Hollywood Stars players
Los Angeles Angels (minor league) players
Major League Baseball outfielders
Nashville Vols players
St. Louis Cardinals players
San Diego Padres (minor league) players
San Francisco Seals (baseball) players
Zanesville Cubs players